These hits topped the Dutch Top 40 in 1975.

See also
1975 in music

References

1975 in the Netherlands
1975 record charts
1975